Kudu and Camo (Chamo) are a nearly extinct Kainji dialect cluster of Nigeria.

References

East Kainji languages
Languages of Nigeria
Endangered Niger–Congo languages